Gerónimo Delgadillo (June 15, 1900 – January 3, 1960) was a Mexican Olympic fencer. He competed in the individual and team épée and sabre events at the 1932 Summer Olympics.

References

External links
 

1900 births
1960 deaths
Mexican male épée fencers
Olympic fencers of Mexico
Fencers at the 1932 Summer Olympics
Sportspeople from Jalisco
Mexican male sabre fencers
20th-century Mexican people